Tynset is the administrative centre of Tynset Municipality in Innlandet county, Norway. The village is located along the river Glåma, about halfway between the villages of Tolga and Alvdal. The village includes a central urban area with several surrounding residential areas. The smaller villages of Fåset (to the southwest) and Telneset (to the northeast) lie a short distance away from Tynset.

Tynset Church is located in the village.

References

Tynset
Villages in Innlandet